Uma Lasan (Western Kenyah) is a Kayan language of Borneo. Uma Lung is marginally intelligible with the other varieties.

External links

Languages of Indonesia
Kenyah languages
Languages of Malaysia